Bakılı PFK is an Azerbaijani football club, based in Baku that currently plays in the Azerbaijan First Division.

History 
The club was founded in 1963 under name of Araz, re-established by Misir Abilov in 1995 and consisted of amateur footballers. Officially as a professional football club it was registered as Araz Football Club in 1997. Since 1998 the club is called Bakili Baku.

The team participated at Soviet Second League in 1990 and 1991 seasons. In addition Bakili Baku has won Azerbaijan USSR League seven times and one time Azerbaijan USSR Cup.

In May 2014, AFFA decided to ban the club from playing next season after players didn't appear at the last game of Azerbaijan First Division. In August 2014, AFFA overturned their decision by allowing club to participate in the 2014–15 season.

Achievements 
Azerbaijan USSR League
Champions (7): 1963, 1967, 1969, 1973, 1974, 1975, 1976

Azerbaijan USSR Cup
Winner (1): 1988

League and domestic cup history

References

External links 
 Bakili Baku at PFL.AZ

Football clubs in Azerbaijan
1963 establishments in Azerbaijan